The 1977 Pacific Southwest Open, also known under its sponsorship name 1977 Arco–Pacific Southwest Open, was a men's tennis tournament played on indoor carpet courts at the Pauley Pavilion in Los Angeles, California in the United States. The event was part of the Grand Prix tennis circuit and categorized as five-star. It was the 51st edition of the tournament and was held from March 28 through April 3, 1977, a departure from its customary slot in September. Third-seeded Stan Smith won the singles title and $23,625 first-prize money as well as 150 ranking points.

Finals

Singles
 Stan Smith defeated  Brian Gottfried 6–4, 2–6, 6–3

Doubles
 Bob Hewitt /  Frew McMillan defeated  Bob Lutz /  Stan Smith 6–3, 6–4

References

External links
 Official website
 ITF tournament edition  details

Los Angeles Open (tennis)
Pacific Southwest Open
Pacific Southwest Open
Pacific Southwest Open
Pacific Southwest Open
Pacific Southwest Open